Novonachalovsky is a rural locality (a settlement) in Nachalovsky Selsoviet, Privolzhsky District, Astrakhan Oblast, Russia. The population was 808 as of 2010. There are 36 streets.

Geography 
Novonachalovsky is located 5 km west of Nachalovo (the district's administrative centre) by road. Tri Potoka is the nearest rural locality.

References 

Rural localities in Privolzhsky District, Astrakhan Oblast